LaSalle station or De La Salle station may refer to:


Canada
LaSalle station (Exo), a commuter rail station in Montreal, Quebec
LaSalle station (Montreal Metro), a rapid transit station in Montreal, Quebec

Mexico
De La Salle (Mexico City Metrobús), a bus rapid transit station in Mexico City

United States
Kirkwood/La Salle station, a light rail station in San Francisco, California
LaSalle station (CTA), a rapid transit station in Chicago, Illinois
LaSalle Street Station, a commuter rail station in Chicago, Illinois
LaSalle/Van Buren station, a rapid transit station in Chicago, Illinois
Peru–LaSalle station, a former railway station in LaSalle, Illinois
LaSalle station (Buffalo Metro Rail), a light rail station in Buffalo, New York

See also